The 2013 SaskPower Saskatchewan Scotties Tournament of Hearts, Saskatchewan's women's provincial curling championship, was held from January 23 to 27 at the Balgonie Stardome in Balgonie, Saskatchewan. The winning team represented Saskatchewan at the 2013 Scotties Tournament of Hearts in Kingston, Ontario.

Qualification Process
Twelve teams will qualify for the provincial tournament through several methods. The qualification process is as follows:

Teams

Standings

Pool A

Pool B

Results

Draw 1
January 23, 2:00 PM
Martin 9-4 Barber
Selzer 7-6 Miller-Jones

Draw 2
January 23, 7:30 PM
Shumay 9-5 Englot
Eberle 7-5 Chisholm
Lawton 8-5 Barker
Paulsen 8-7 Holland

Draw 3
January 24, 2:00 PM
Eberle 10-4 Miller-Jones 
Selzer 4-1 Barker 
Holland 9-5 Martin
Shumay 13-5 Barber

Draw 4
January 24, 7:30 PM

Paulsen 9-8 Barber 
Lawton 9-3 Miller-Jones 
Chisholm 8-1 Selzer
Englot 7-5 Martin

Draw 5
January 25, 10:00 AM

Lawton 8-3 Selzer
Paulsen 8-7 Martin
Englot 7-4 Barber
Chisholm 6-3 Miller-Jones

Draw 6
January 25, 2:30 PM

Englot 7-5 Paulsen
Shumay 8-5 Holland
Lawton 7-2 Chisholm 
Eberle 9-3 Barker

Draw 7
January 25, 7:00 PM

Holland 8-3 Barber
Barker 10-2 Miller-Jones
Eberle 5-3 Selzer
Shumay 7-2 Martin

Draw 8
January 26, 9:00 AM

Barker 8-2 Chisholm
Holland 8-4 Englot
Shumay 8-4 Paulsen
Lawton 7-5 Eberle

Tie breakers
January 26, 1:30 PM

January 26, 5:30 PM

Playoffs

A1 vs. B1
January 26, 7:30 PM

A2 vs. B2
January 26, 7:30 PM

Semifinal
January 27, 1:00 PM

Final
Sunday, January 27, 5:00 pm

Qualification rounds

Northern Qualification
The 2013 SaskPower Women's Northern Playdown will take place from January 10 to 13 at the Twin Rivers Curling Club in North Battleford. The format of play shall be an open-entry triple knockout, and four teams will be qualify to the provincial playoffs.

Teams

Results

A Event

B Event

C Event

Southern Qualification
The 2013 SaskPower Women's Southern Playdown will take place from January 10 to 13 at the Melville Curling Club in Melville. The format of play will be an open-entry triple knockout, and four teams will qualify to the provincial playoffs.

Teams

Results

A Event

B Event

C Event

References

Saskatchewan
Curling in Saskatchewan
Saskatchewan Scotties Tournament of Hearts